Sustainia, formerly the Copenhagen Climate Council, is a global collaboration between international business and science founded by Erik Rasmussen founder of the leading independent think tank in Scandinavia, Monday Morning, based in Copenhagen. The councilors of the Copenhagen Climate Council have come together to create global awareness of the importance of the UN Climate Summit (COP15) in Copenhagen, December 2009, and to ensure technical and public support and assistance to global decision makers when agreeing on a new climate treaty to replace the Kyoto Protocol from 1997.

Organization
The Copenhagen Climate Council was founded in 2007 by the leading independent think tank in Scandinavia, Monday Morning, evolving into sustainability think tank Sustainia headquartered in Copenhagen, Denmark.

Purpose
The purpose of the Copenhagen Climate Council is to create global awareness of the importance of the UN Climate Summit (COP15) in Copenhagen, December 2009. Leading up to this pivotal UN meeting, the Copenhagen Climate Council works on presenting innovative yet achievable solutions to climate change, as well as assess what is required to make a new global treaty effective. The council will seek to promote constructive dialogue between government and business, so that when the world's political leaders and negotiators meet in Copenhagen, they will do so armed with the very best arguments for establishing a treaty that can be supported by global business.
By promoting and demonstrating innovative, positive, and meaningful business leadership and ideas, the Copenhagen Climate Council aims to demonstrate that achieving an effective global climate treaty is not only possible, but necessary. The strategy is built upon the following principles:
 Creating international awareness of the importance of the Copenhagen UN Climate Summit and the successor treaty to the Kyoto Protocol.
 Promoting constructive dialogue between government, business, and science.
 Inspiring global business leaders by demonstrating that tackling climate change also has the potential to create huge opportunities for innovation and economic growth.

Manifesto
Published in November 2007, on the eve of the UN COP13 Climate Change Conference in Bali – the instigation night of the Bali Road Map. The document outlines what the council believes is required to tackle climate change and how this can be achieved through a new global treaty. The Manifesto articulates a clear goal for the maximum level of greenhouse gases in the atmosphere by 2050. The document will serve as input at the World Business Summit on Climate Change, outlining key elements for further discussion and inclusion in the recommendations to be delivered to the UN Summit.

Membership
Copenhagen Climate Council comprises 30 global climate leaders representing business, science, and public policy from all parts of the world. 
 Business leaders are selected to represent global companies and innovative entrepreneurs, who, through their actions, reveal that sustainable, climate-responsible business is both necessary and profitable.
 Scientists are gathered to ensure that the work of the council is underpinned by rigorous analysis.
 Policy makers with experience in public policy are included in the council to ensure that the work is informed by knowledge of what is required to assist high-level, complex policy negotiations.

The Councilors
The Councilors to the Copenhagen Climate Council are:
Tim Flannery, chairman of Copenhagen Climate Council, writer and scientist
Erik Rasmussen, founder, Copenhagen Climate Council; and founder of Monday Morning & Sustainia
 Steven Chu, U.S. Energy Secretary
Shai Agassi, CEO and founder, Project Better Place
Carsten Bjerg, fmr. CEO, Grundfos
David Blood, senior partner, Generation Investment Management
Sir Richard Branson, founder and CEO, Virgin Group
James Cameron, vice chairman, 
Subhash Chandra, chairman of Zee Entertainment Enterprises Limited
Jørgen Mads Clausen, CEO, Danfoss
Anders Eldrup, fmr. president of DONG Energy Denmark, now Ørsted
Ditlev Engel, fmr. CEO, Vestas Wind Systems A/S, now DNV GL Energy
Yoichi Funabashi, editor-in-chief, The Asahi Shimbun
Lord Michael Jay, Baron Jay of Ewelme - Globe International advisory board member and Lord Jay of Ewelme
 Daniel M. Kammen, professor and co-director, Berkeley Institute of the Environment
Sir David King, scientist and director of the Smith School of Enterprise and the Environment at the University of Oxford
Lise Kingo, executive vice president and chief of staff, Novo Nordisk, now UNGC
Thomas E. Lovejoy, president, H. John Heinz III Center for Science, Economics and Environment
James Lovelock, scientist, inventor and author
Rob Morrison, chairman, CLSA Asia-Pacific Markets
Paul S. Otellini, president and chief executive officer, Intel
Robert Purves, AM chair of Environment Business Australia and board member WWW International
James E. Rogers, chairman of the board, president and CEO, Duke Energy
Dr. Zhengrong Shi, chairman of the board and CEO, Suntech Power
Björn Stigson, president, World Business Council for Sustainable Development
Sir Crispin Tickell, director of the Policy Foresight Programme, James Martin Institute for Science and Civilization, Oxford University
Moses Tsang, CEO, Ajia Partners
Jens Ulltveit-Moe, CEO, Umoe AS
 Li Xiaolin, Vice Chairman and CEO, China Electric Power International Co. Ltd.

Activities
The central aim of the Copenhagen Climate Council is to create global awareness to the urgency of reaching a global agreement on how to tackle climate change at the UN Climate Conference in Copenhagen, December 2009. To achieve this end, the Copenhagen Climate Council provides a Web 2.0 climate website – 'The Climate Community' – now evolved into the Global Opportunity Explorer - co

funded by UNGC, DNVGL and Sustainia - which features latest climate news, intelligence, solutions and points of view, an online climate community, as well as the rest of the Copenhagen Climate Council activities, such as the 'World Business Summit on Climate Change'; launching the 'Thought Leadership Series'; launching the 'Climate LIFE' film, book, and digital exhibition; co-hosting with CITRIS the scientific conference 'Unlocking the Climate Code: Innovation in Climate and Energy'; and the Poznań side event 'Business Requirements of a Post-2012 Climate Treaty'. Recently, the Copenhagen Climate Council has also hosted a Business Roundtable in Beijing.

The Climate Community
The Climate Community (now the Global Opportunity Explorer) is the official website of the Copenhagen Climate Council. The website is based on Web 2.0 principles, and hooks the user up with the world's leading climate stakeholders and offers possibility for the user to give voice and influence the global climate agenda. The Climate Community aims to bring the latest and most relevant news, insights, and intelligence that equips the user to navigate the climate challenges and turn risks into opportunities.
The Climate Community features an extensive news section with Top Stories, Daily News Summaries, Points of Views, and a Weekly Roundup, searchable by date, region and sector.

Exclusive news features so far include interviews with U.S. Energy Secretary Steve Chu, UN Climate Chief Yvo de Boer, the Danish Climate minister Connie Hedegaard, IPCC Chairman Rajendra Pachauri, Professor Daniel Kammen, Lars Josefsson, CEO of Vattenfall. The Climate Community also features regular updates on the COP15 negotiation process and important upcoming events.  The unique content on Community also includes selected and in-depth descriptions of innovative business solutions.
A valuable feature on the Community is the Climate Intelligence Archive, which selects and list key international policies, research reports, government agencies, NGOs, inspiring media sources, and upcoming climate events.

The Climate Community also hosts an online Virtual Summit, which is an integral part of the World Business Summit on Climate Change to take place in May 2009. The Virtual Summit will facilitate knowledge sharing and collaboration, as well as be a testing ground for new ideas and partnerships through interactive web 2.0 tools.

World Business Summit on Climate Change
The World Business Summit on Climate Change takes place six months prior to the pivotal UN climate change conference (COP15) in Copenhagen, December 2009. The summit brings together business chief executives with the world's top scientists, economists, civil society, media leaders, government representatives and other leading thinkers to put forward recommendations for the next international framework on climate change to replace the Kyoto Protocol after 2012. Among the prominent participants so far are Al Gore, chairman of Generation Investment Management; Anders Fogh Rasmussen, Prime Minister of Denmark; and Sir Richard Branson, founder and CEO of the Virgin Group.

At the summit, chief executives will discuss how business can help solve the climate crisis through innovative business models, new partnerships and the development of low carbon technologies. They will send a message to the negotiating governments on how to remove barriers and create incentives for implementation of new solutions in a post-Kyoto.
The results of the World Business Summit on Climate Change will be presented to the Danish government, host of COP15, and to world leaders negotiating the terms of the next international climate treaty.

Thought Leadership Series
The Copenhagen Climate Council Thought Leadership Series on Climate Change is a publication that will be published in hardcopy and on the Copenhagen Climate Council Home Page in the lead up to the World Business Summit on Climate Change in May 2009. The Thought Leadership Series presents a collection of inspirational, concise and clearly argued pieces from some of the world's most renowned thinkers and business leaders on climate change. The objective of the pieces is to assist in enhancing the public and political awareness of the actions that could have a significant impact on global emissions growth and to disseminate the message that it is time to act hence a new UN climate treaty will be developed in December 2009.
The Thought Leadership Series is aimed at elucidating and creating awareness of the key elements in the business and policy response to the climate problem. The rationale for the Thought Leadership Series is firstly to change the focus from stating we have a problem to communicating the solutions to the problem, and secondly to show the potential and opportunities inherent in tackling climate change.

The themes of the Thought Leadership series are:

 01 Tackling Emissions Growth: The Role of Markets and Government Regulation
 02 Achieving low emissions energy systems in rapidly developing economies
 03 Drawing down  from the atmosphere
 04 The role of city planning and buildings in tackling emissions growth
 05 Achieving the capital investment required to tackle climate change
 06 The CEO's survival guide to climate change
 07 Adapting to the impacts of climate change
 08 Role of Information and Communications Technology in Addressing Climate Change
 09 Beyond a global agreement: Scenarios from the future

Climate LIFE
Climate LIFE is a film, book and digital exhibition project initiated by the Copenhagen Climate Council. Climate LIFE is intended to be “a virtual tour of how communities across the globe can both fight climate change and adapt to a warming world”. The purpose of Climate LIFE is to encourage awareness of and appreciation for the human and commercial potential in a low carbon future. The Copenhagen Climate Council With hopes for Climate LIFE to act as a catalyst for a new public discourse on climate change.

FILM : “Climate LIFE - the 5th revolution”
Climate LIFE - the 5th revolution is an “emotional and strong story” of a journey across the world in search of the solutions so urgently needed for avoiding a world climate life gone a wreck. It is produced in the realisation that we need a new climate agenda in order to achieve a transition to a sustainable society. The Copenhagen Climate Council has stated it is “necessary” to tell the story of climate change using a new positive language that can appeal to new audiences. Particularly, the Copenhagen Climate Council wishes to use “evocative and emotional storytelling” to get behind the real motivations, which has made pioneers, community leaders and others act on climate changes. Through compelling and evocative story-telling, the audiences will themselves feel the urgency of the quest and be inspired to take action.
Climate LIFE will be a follow-up to Al Gore's 'An inconvenient truth'. Where Al Gore opened the world's eyes to the massiveness of climate change, Climate LIFE intends to tell the new convenient truth of climate change - that the knowledge and solutions we know today give us the opportunity to create communities that enhance quality of life; that it is possible to build a greener, safer and more sustainable Earth.
Climate Life - the 5th revolution aims to show that the precondition for the success is already present. A short feature will be launched at the World Business Summit on Climate Change and subsequently it will be shown at events, on the web, and will also be distributed to TV broadcasters across the world.
The film is produced in collaboration with Koncern Film and TV.

The LIFE Digital exhibition
The LIFE digital Exhibition is intended to demonstrate what makes Climate LIFE possible. When launched on the web, it will explore the delivery model necessary to achieve the vision of Climate LIFE. Looking at the political, economic and cultural systems as well as the technological and biological process that will underpin low carbon living in the future, the exhibition will present a variety of practical solutions and their implications, highlighting the state of the art in movement, energy production and efficient consumption, water and waste management etc. The exhibition aims to use the latest social software advances and interactive tools to illustrate the challenges, how they affect people, and the possibilities for getting involved.

Unlocking the Climate Code: Innovation in Climate and Energy
On June 19, 2008, Copenhagen Climate Council and Center for Information Technology Research in the Interest of Society (CITRIS) co-hosted an energy conference named Unlocking the Climate Code: Innovation in Climate and Energy. The aim of the conference was to identify the critical research and development achievements necessary for a successful transition to a low-carbon economy. Conference participants will present and debate relevant policy and business models that can support technology innovation in carbon emissions reduction.
In an effort to create models of the relationships in business, policy, and technology to help guide innovative and rational decision making at the 2009 UN Summit, a suite of tools was developed, better known as the Climate Navigator.
According to Gary Baldwin, director of Special Projects at CITRIS, the Climate Navigator will have several interrelated parts and functions. It will serve as an Internet-based community forum for researchers, policy makers, and business leaders, allowing politicians and others to direct questions to experts or open on-line discussions about specific proposals. It will also be a digital library, organizing the growing base of knowledge about how business models and policy can influence technology. In addition, the Navigator will employ new technology itself, including computer modeling applications developed by Dan Kammen's lab at Berkeley.

Business Requirements of a Post-2012 Climate Treaty
On December 8, 2008, the Copenhagen Climate Council hosted an official side event at the UN COP14 Summit on Climate Change in Poznań, Poland from December 1–10, 2008. The theme was Business Requirements to a Post-2012 Climate Treaty. At the event, Council representatives from business and science presented their key principles for a new treaty. The thoughts presented at the event will feed into the development of the final recommendations delivered by international business leaders at the World Business Summit on Climate Change, to be held in Copenhagen in May, 2009.

The speakers delivered their views on what they would toast to in Copenhagen. They included: Copenhagen Climate Council Chairman Tim Flannery; Robert Purves from World Wildlife Fund International; Jerry Stokes, president of Suntech Europe; Dr. Zhengrong Shi, founder and CEO of Suntech; Steve Harper of Intel; Susanne Stormer from Novo Nordisk; Michael Zarin of Vestas; and Thomas Becker, the lead climate negotiator for the Danish government that will host the UN COP15 climate summit in December, 2009. The session was moderated by Nick Rowley, strategic director at Copenhagen Climate Council.

Read the entire news summary from Poznań side event here

Business Roundtable in Beijing
On November 11, 2008, the Copenhagen Climate Council hosted a roundtable meeting with some of the most prominent business leaders in China and the Danish Minister for Climate and Energy Connie Hedegaard. According to the Copenhagen Climate Council, conclusion of the summit was clear: “Climate change is becoming an important issue for Chinese CEOs, and opportunities in energy-efficient products and renewable energy are a driver for change.”

"Chinese business leaders recognize that sustainable development is a corporate responsibility, and that the need for creating economic growth in China should meet the needs of sound environment protection. I encourage all industries to respond and to collaborate – hand in hand – on tackling the challenge. I want to make sure that our children can live on a beautiful planet with blue sky and clean air. We are dedicated to this," said Li Xiaolin, chairwoman and CEO of China Power International, one of Chinas five-biggest energy suppliers.

Read the entire news summary from Business Roundtable in Beijing here

History
The Copenhagen Climate Council was founded in 2007 by Erik Rasmussen, founder, Copenhagen Climate Council; CEO and editor-in-chief, Monday Morning.

Organizations based in Copenhagen
Climate change organizations